Yr Ymofynnydd (the Inquirer), is the monthly magazine of Welsh-speaking Unitarians, published since 1847.

References

Unitarianism in the United Kingdom